Beginning in the mid-1930s, Japan conducted numerous attempts to acquire and develop weapons of mass destruction. The 1943 Battle of Changde saw Japanese use of both bioweapons and chemical weapons, and the Japanese conducted a serious, though futile, nuclear weapon program.

Since World War II, the United States military based nuclear and chemical weapons and field tested biological anti-crop weapons in Japan.

Japan has since become a nuclear-capable state, said to be a "screwdriver's turn" away from nuclear weapons; having the capacity, the know-how, and the materials to make a nuclear bomb. Japan has consistently eschewed any desire to have nuclear weapons, and no mainstream Japanese party has ever advocated acquisition of nuclear weapons or any weapons of mass destruction. There are controversies on whether such weapons are forbidden by the Japanese constitution or not. Japan has signed many treaties prohibiting these kinds of weapons.

Japan is the only nation that has been attacked with atomic weapons. Prior to 1946 Japan carried out many attacks using weapons of mass destruction (chemical and biological), principally in China.  In 1995, Japanese citizens released chemical weapons in Tokyo in a domestic terror attack.

Japanese possession of weapons of mass destruction

Bioweapons

Japan became interested in obtaining biological weapons during the early 1930s. Following an international ban on germ warfare in 1925 by the Geneva Protocol Japan reasoned that disease epidemics must make effective weapons. Japan developed new methods of biological warfare (BW) and used them on a large scale in China.
During the Sino-Japanese War (1937–1945) and World War II, Unit 731 and other Special Research Units of the Imperial Japanese Army conducted human experimentation on thousands, mostly Chinese, Korean, Russian, American, and other nationalities as well as some Japanese criminals from the Japanese mainlands. In military campaigns, the Japanese army used biological weapons on Chinese soldiers and civilians.

Japan's infamous biological warfare Unit 731 was led by Lt. General Shirō Ishii.
Unit 731 used plague-infected fleas and flies covered with cholera to infect the population in China.
The Japanese military dispersed insects by spraying them from low-flying airplanes and dropping ceramic bombs they had developed that were filled with mixtures containing insects and diseases that could affect humans, animals, and crops.
Localized and deadly epidemics resulted and an estimated 200,000 to 500,000 Chinese died of disease.
Recent additional firsthand accounts testify the Japanese infected civilians through the distribution of plague-infested foodstuffs, such as dumplings and vegetables.
During the Changde chemical weapon attacks, the Japanese also employed biological warfare by intentionally spreading infected fleas. In Zhejiang Province cholera, dysentery, and typhoid were employed. Harbin also suffered Japanese biological attacks. Other battles include the Kaimingye germ weapon attack in Ningbo.

Japan sent a submarine with unspecified biological weapons early in 1944 to defend the island of Saipan from American invasion; however the submarine was sunk.

Another attack against American troops with biological weapons was planned during the invasion of Iwo Jima. The planned involved towing gliders laden with pathogens over the American lines. However, this plan never took shape. Had it succeeded, thousands of American soldiers and marines may have died, and the operation as a whole may very well have failed.

Japan's biowarfare experts had hoped to launch biological attacks on the U.S. in 1944 with balloon bombs filled with bubonic plague, anthrax, rinderpest, and smut fungus. A 1945-planned kamikaze attack on San Diego with I-400-class submarine aircraft carriers that would deploy Aichi M6As floatplanes and drop fleas infected with bubonic plague was code-named Operation Cherry Blossoms at Night. The plans were rejected by Hideki Tojo who feared similar retaliation by the United States.

Japanese scientists from Unit 731 provided research information for the United States biological weapons program in order to escape war crimes charges. Bob Dohini, a former war crimes prosecution team lawyer, recently claimed that there was no mention of germ warfare in the investigation of war Japanese crimes. The fact was not well known until the 1980s. Japan's emperor was unable to be tried. Later revelations indicated his knowledge of the program.

Japan's employment of BW was largely viewed as ineffective, due to the absence of efficient production or delivery technology. The U.S. government provided a stipend to the Japanese BW military scientists and researches. Japanese biological warfare information provided to U.S. authorities after World War II remained a secret and was eventually returned to Japan.

Right-wing Japanese officials claim that no proof of Japan's wartime atrocities exists.

In August 2002, a Japanese court ended decades of official denials and acknowledged, for the first time, that Japan had used germ warfare in occupied China in the 1930s and 1940s. The court acknowledged the existence of Japan's biological warfare program but rejected the plaintiffs' demands for compensation, saying the issue was covered under postwar treaties. Following the court decision, Japanese officials announced that their government would send a delegation to China to excavate and remove hundreds of abandoned chemical weapons, including bombs, shells, and containers of mustard gas and other toxins left over from the Second World War.

Japan's biological warfare experts and scientists from WWII, were alleged to have assisted the US in employment of BW in the Korean War.

Chemical weapons
The Japanese used mustard gas and the blister agent Lewisite against Chinese troops and guerillas in China, amongst others during the Changde chemical weapon attack.

Experiments involving chemical weapons were conducted on live prisoners (Unit 516). As of 2005, sixty years after the end of the war, canisters that were abandoned by Japan in their hasty retreat are still being dug up in construction sites, causing injuries and allegedly even deaths.

Several chemical attacks on various people using VX gas and sarin and the Tokyo subway sarin attack on the Tokyo subway on March 20, 1995, were perpetrated by members of the cult movement Aum Shinrikyo in acts of domestic terrorism. A large stockpile of other chemical agents and precursor chemicals were later found in raids on their facilities.

In 1995, JGSDF admitted possession of sarin samples for defense purposes.

Japan had signed the Chemical Weapons Convention in December 1993. Japan ratified The Chemical Weapons Convention in 1995 and was thus a state party upon it entering into force in 1997.

Nuclear weapons

A Japanese program to develop nuclear weapons was conducted during World War II. Like the German nuclear weapons program, it suffered from an array of problems, and was ultimately unable to progress beyond the laboratory stage before the atomic bombings of Hiroshima and Nagasaki and the Japanese surrender in August 1945.

The postwar Constitution forbids the establishment of offensive military forces, but not nuclear weapons explicitly. In 1967 it adopted the Three Non-Nuclear Principles, ruling out the production, possession, or introduction of nuclear weapons. Japan signed the Treaty on the Non-Proliferation of Nuclear Weapons in February 1970.

While there are currently no known plans in Japan to produce nuclear weapons, it has been argued that Japan has the technology, raw materials, and the capital to produce nuclear weapons within one year if necessary, and some analysts consider it a de facto nuclear state for this reason. For this reason Japan is often said to be a "screwdriver's turn" away from possessing nuclear weapons.

During the 2016 U.S. presidential election it was proposed by GOP candidates to allow both Japan and the Republic of Korea to develop nuclear weapons to counter a North Korean missile threat.

Delivery systems

Solid fuel rockets are the design of choice for military applications as they can remain in storage for long periods, and then reliably launch at short notice.

Lawmakers made national security arguments for keeping Japan's solid-fuel rocket technology alive after ISAS was merged into the Japan Aerospace Exploration Agency, which also has the H-IIA liquid-fueled rocket, in 2003. The ISAS director of external affairs, Yasunori Matogawa, said, "It seems the hard-line national security proponents in parliament are increasing their influence, and they aren't getting much criticism…I think we’re moving into a very dangerous period. When you consider the current environment and the threat from North Korea, it’s scary."

Toshiyuki Shikata, a government adviser and former lieutenant general, indicated that part of the rationale for the fifth M-V Hayabusa mission was that the reentry and landing of its return capsule demonstrated "that Japan's ballistic missile capability is credible."

At a technical level the M-V design could be weaponised quickly (as an Intercontinental ballistic missile) although this would be politically unlikely.

In response to the perceived threat from North Korean-launched ballistic missiles, Japanese government officials have proposed developing a first strike capability for Japan's military that includes ballistic and cruise missiles.

North Korean weapons of mass destruction and Japan

The threat of North Korea-based ballistic missiles that are within range of Japan have guided Japanese and U.S. defense and deterrence strategies.

South Korean weapons of mass destruction and Japan

South Korean interest in developing an atomic bomb began in 1950. The interest was partially a result of the rapid surrender of Korea's then-enemy Japan following use of atomic bombs in World War II. Post-war aggression from the North and from the People's Republic of China solidified that interest. A South Korean nuclear facility began to reprocess fuel and enrich plutonium based on the observation that Japan was also producing it.

In late 1958, nuclear weapons were deployed by the U.S. from Kadena Air Base in Okinawa to Kunsan Air Base in South Korea in order to oppose military actions by the People's Republic of China during the Second Taiwan Strait Crisis.

U.S. weapons of mass destruction and Japan
Okinawa has long been viewed as a stepping-stone to force open the remainder of Japan and Asia. Commodore Perry's gunboat diplomacy expedition to open Japan to U.S. trade began in Okinawa in 1852.

By the early 1950s and the outbreak of the Korean War, Okinawa was seen as America's Gibraltar of the Pacific.

U.S. bioweapons and Japan

In 1939, the U.S. State Department reported that a Japanese Army physician in New York City had attempted to obtain a Yellow fever virus sample from the Rockefeller Institute for Medical Research. The incident contributed to a sense of urgency in the United States to research a BW capability. By 1942 George W. Merck, president of Merck and Company, was made chairman of the War Research Service which was established to oversee the U.S. development of BW-related technology at Camp Detrick.

After World War II ended, a U.S. War Departments report notes that "in addition to the results of human experimentation much data is available from the Japanese experiments on animals and food crops".
The technical information of Japan's BW program participants was transferred into U.S. intelligence agencies and BW programs in exchange for immunity for war crimes charges.

Korean War allegations

In 1951, the first of many allegations were made against the United States by the communist belligerent nations in the Korean war of employing biological warfare using various techniques in attacks launched from bases on Okinawa.

U.S. anti-plant biological weapons research

In 1945 Japan's rice crop was terribly affected by rice blast disease. The outbreak as well as another in Germany's potato crop coincided with covert Allied research in these areas. The timing of these outbreaks generated persistent speculation of some connection between the events however the rumors were never proven and the outbreaks could have been naturally occurring.

Sheldon H. Harris in Factories of Death: Japanese Biological Warfare, 1932–1945, and the American Cover Up wrote:

U.S. anti-plant chemical agents research

During the Second World War limited test use of aerial spray delivery systems was employed only on several Japanese-controlled tropical islands to demarcate points for navigation and to kill dense island foliage. Despite the availability of the spray equipment, herbicide application with aerial chemical delivery systems were not systematically implemented in the Pacific theater during the war.

At the close of World War Two, the U.S. planned to attack Japan's food supply with anti-crop chemical agents and by July 1945 had stockpiled an amount of chemicals "sufficient to destroy one-tenth of the rice crop of Japan." However, logistical problems would have reduced that estimate.

In addition to work done in the anti-crop theater during the Cold War, the screening program for chemical defoliants was greatly accelerated. By the end of fiscal year 1962, the Chemical Corps had let or were negotiating contracts for over one thousand chemical defoliants. "The Okinawa tests evidently were fruitful." The presence of so-called rainbow herbicides such as Agent Orange has been widely reported on Okinawa as well as at other locations in Japan. The U.S. government disputes these assertions and the issues surrounding the subject of military use anti-plant agents in Japan during the 1950s through the 1970s remains a controversy.

Arthropod vector research

At Kadena Air Force Base, an Entomology Branch of the U.S. Army Preventive Medicine Activity, U.S. Army Medical Center was used to grow "medically important" arthropods, including many strains of mosquitoes in a study of disease vector efficiency. The program reportedly supported a research program studying taxonomic and ecological data surveys for the Smithsonian Institution."
The Smithsonian Institution and The National Academy of Sciences and National Research Council administered special research projects in the Pacific. The Far East Section of the Office of the Foreign Secretary administered two such projects which focused "on the flora of Okinawa" and "trapping of airborne insects and arthropods for the study of the natural dispersal of insects and arthropods over the ocean." The motivation for civilian research programs of this nature was questioned when it was learned that such international research was in fact funded by and provided to the U.S. Army as requirement related to the U.S. military's biological warfare research.

Weather modification research

Operation Pop Eye / Motorpool / Intermediary-Compatriot was a highly classified weather modification program in Southeast Asia during 1967-1972 that was developed from cloud seeding research conducted on Okinawa and other tropical locations.
A report titled Rainmaking in SEASIA outlines use of silver iodide deployed by aircraft in a program that was developed in California at Naval Air Weapons Station China Lake. The technique was refined and tested in Okinawa, Guam, Philippines, Texas, and Florida in a hurricane study program called Project Stormfury.

The chemical weather modification program was conducted from Thailand over Cambodia, Laos, and Vietnam. The program was allegedly sponsored by Secretary of State Henry Kissinger and the Central Intelligence Agency without the authorization of Secretary of Defense Melvin Laird. Laird had categorically denied to Congress that a program for modification of the weather existed. The program employed cloud seeding as a weapon which was used to induce rain and extend the East Asian Monsoon season in support of U.S. government strategic efforts related to the War in Southeast Asia. The use of a military weather control program was related to the destruction of enemy food crops. Whether the use of a weather modification program was directly related to any of the chemical and biological warfare programs is not documented. However, it is certain that some of the military herbicides in use in Vietnam required rainfall to be absorbed.

In theory, any CBW program employing fungus spores or a mosquito vector would have also benefited from prolonged periods of rain. Rice blast sporulation on diseased leaves occurs when relative humidity approaches 100%. Laboratory measurements indicate sporulation increases with the length of time 100% relative humidity prevails.
The Aedes aegypti mosquito lays eggs and requires standing water to reproduce. Approximately three days after it feeds on blood, the mosquito lays her eggs over a period of several days. The eggs are resistant to desiccation and can survive for periods of six or more months. When rain floods the eggs with water, the larvae hatch.

U.S. chemical weapons and Japan

U.S. chemical weapons in Japan were deployed to Okinawa in the early 1950s. The Red Hat mission deployed additional chemical agents in three military operations code named YBA, YBB, and YBF. The operation deployed chemical agents to the 267th Chemical Platoon on Okinawa during the early 1960s under Project 112.
The shipments, according to declassified documents, included sarin, VX, and mustard gas. By 1969, according to later newspaper reports, there was an estimated 1.9 million kg (1,900 metric tons) of VX stored on Okinawa. The chemical weapons brought to Okinawa included nerve and blister agents contained in rockets, artillery shells, bombs, mines, and one-ton (900 kg) containers. The chemicals were stored at Chibana Ammunition Depot. The depot was a hill-top installation next to Kadena Air Base.

In 1969, over 20 servicemen (23 U.S. soldiers and one U.S. civilian, according to other reports) were exposed to low levels of the nerve agent sarin while sandblasting and repainting storage containers. The resultant publicity appears to have contributed to the decision to move the weapons off Okinawa.
The U.S. then government directed relocation of chemical munitions. The chemical warfare agents were removed from Okinawa in 1971 during Operation Red Hat. Operation Red Hat involved the removal of chemical warfare munitions from Okinawa to Johnston Atoll in the Central Pacific Ocean.
An official U.S. film on the mission says that 'safety was the primary concern during the operation,' though Japanese resentment of U.S. military activities on Okinawa also complicated the situation. At the technical level, time pressures imposed to complete the mission, the heat, and water rationing problems also complicated the planning.

The initial phase of Operation Red Hat involved the movement of chemical munitions from a depot storage site to Tengan Pier, eight miles away, and required 1,332 trailers in 148 convoys. The second phase of the operation moved the munitions to Johnston Atoll. The Army leased  on Johnston. Phase I of the operation took place in January and moved 150 tons of distilled mustard agent. The  arrived at Johnston Atoll with the first load of projectiles on January 13, 1971. Phase II completed cargo discharge to Johnston Atoll with five moves of the remaining 12,500 tons of munitions, in August and September 1971.
Units operating under United States Army Ryukyu Islands (USARYIS) were 2nd Logistical Command and the 267th Chemical Company, the 5th and 196th Ordnance Detachments (EOD), and the 175th Ordnance Detachment.

Originally, it was planned that the munitions be moved to Umatilla Chemical Depot but this never happened due to public opposition and political pressure. The Congress passed legislation on January 12, 1971 (PL 91-672) that prohibited the transfer of nerve agent, mustard agent, agent orange and other chemical munitions to all 50 U.S. states.
In 1985 the U.S. Congress mandated that all chemical weapons stockpiled at Johnston Atoll, mostly mustard gas, Sarin, and VX gas, be destroyed. Prior to the beginning of destruction operations, Johnston Atoll held about 6.6 percent of the entire U.S. stockpile of chemical weapons.
The Johnston Atoll Chemical Agent Disposal System (JACADS) was built to destroy all the chemical munitions stored on Johnston island. The first weapon disposal incineration operation took place on June 30, 1990. The last munitions were destroyed in 2000.

U.S. nuclear weapons and Japan

The intensity of the fighting and the high number of casualties during the Battle of Okinawa formed the basis of the casualty estimates projected for the invasion of Japan that led to the decision to launch the atomic bombing of Japan. Atomic bombs were deployed in order to avoid having “an[nother] Okinawa from one end of Japan to the other.”

The atomic age on Japan's southern islands began during the final weeks of the war when the U.S. Army Air Force launched two atomic attacks on Hiroshima and Nagasaki from bases on Tinian in the Marianas Islands. Bockscar, the B-29 that dropped the Fat Man nuclear weapon on Nagasaki, landed at Yontan Airfield on Okinawa on August 9, 1945. The U.S. military immediately began constructing a second B-29 base and a facility for atom bomb processing in Okinawa to be completed in September 1945 that would open more targets in mainland Japan.

U.S. nuclear weapon atmospheric testing

Japanese naval warships captured by the U.S. after Japan's surrender in World War II, including the Nagato, were used as target ships and destroyed in 1946 in nuclear testing at Bikini Atoll during Operation Crossroads. The atomic testing was conducted in the Marshall Islands group that U.S. forces captured in early 1944 from the Japanese.

The first hydrogen bomb detonation, known as Castle Bravo, contaminated Japanese fisherman on the Daigo Fukuryū Maru with nuclear fallout on March 4, 1954. The incident further rallied a powerful anti-nuclear movement.

Nuclear weapons agreements

Article 9 of the Japanese Constitution, written by MacArthur immediately after the war, does not explicitly prohibit nuclear weapons. But when the U.S. military occupation of Japan ended in 1951, a new security treaty was signed that granted the United States rights to base its "land, sea, and air forces in and about Japan." 

In 1959, Prime Minister Nobusuke Kishi stated that Japan would neither develop nuclear weapons nor permit them on its territory". He instituted the Three Non-Nuclear Principles--"no production, no possession, and no introduction." 

A 1960 accord with Japan permits the United States to move weapons of mass destruction through Japanese territory and allows American warships and submarines to carry nuclear weapons into Japan's ports and American aircraft to bring them in during landings. The discussion took place during negotiations in 1959, and the agreement was made in 1960 by Aiichiro Fujiyama, then Japan's Foreign Minister.
"There were many things left unsaid; it was a very sophisticated negotiation. The Japanese are masters at understood and unspoken communication in which one is asked to draw inferences from what may not be articulated."

The secret agreement was concluded without any Japanese text so that it could be plausibly denied in Japan. Since only the American officials recorded the oral agreement, not having the agreement recorded in Japanese allowed Japan's leaders to deny its existence without fear that someone would leak a document to prove them wrong. The arrangement also made it appear that the United States alone was responsible for the transit of nuclear munitions through Japan. However, the original agreement document turned up in 1969 during preparation for an updated agreement, when a memorandum was written by a group of U.S. officials from the National Security Council Staff; the Departments of State, Defense, Army, Commerce and Treasury; the Joint Chiefs of Staff; the Central Intelligence Agency; and the United States Information Agency.

A 1963 Central Intelligence Agency National Intelligence Estimate stated that: '...US bases in Japan and related problems of weapons and forces will continue to involve issues of great sensitivity in Japan-US relations. The government is bound to be responsive to the popular pressures which the left can whip up on these issues. We do not believe that this situation will lead to demands by any conservative government for evacuation of the bases.'

During the early parts of the Cold War the Bonin Islands including Chichi Jima, the Ryukyu Islands including Okinawa, and the Volcano Islands including Iwo Jima were retained under American control. The islands were among "thirteen separate locations in Japan that had nuclear weapons or components, or were earmarked to receive nuclear weapons in times of crisis or war." According to a former U.S. Air Force officer stationed on Iwo Jima, the island would have served as a recovery facility for bombers after they had dropped their bombs in the Soviet Union or China. War planners reasoned that bombers could return Iwo Jima, "where they would be refueled, reloaded, and readied to deliver a second salvo as an assumption was that the major U.S. Bases in Japan and the Pacific theater would be destroyed in a nuclear war." It was believed by war planners that a small base might evade destruction and be a safe harbor for surviving submarines to reload. Supplies to re-equip submarines as well as Anti-submarine weapons were stored within caves on Chichi Jima. The Johnson administration gradually realized that it would be forced to return Chichi Jima and Iwo Jima "to delay reversion of the more important Okinawa bases" however, President Johnson also wanted Japan's support for U.S. Military operations in Southeast Asia." The Bonin and Volcano islands were eventually returned to Japan in June 1968.

Prime Minister Eisaku Satō and Foreign Minister Takeo Miki had explained to the Japanese parliament that "the return of the Bonins had nothing to do with nuclear weapons yet the final agreement included a secret annex, and its exact wording remained classified." A December 30, 1968, cable from the U.S. embassy in Tokyo is titled "Bonin Agreement Nuclear Storage," but within the same file "the National Archives contains a 'withdrawal sheet' for an attached Tokyo cable dated April 10, 1968, titled 'Bonins Agreement--Secret Annex,'".

On the one year anniversary of the B-52 crash and explosion at Kadena Prime Minister Sato and President Nixon met in Washington, DC where several agreements including a revised Status of Forces Agreement (SOFA) and a formal policy related to the future deployment of nuclear weapons on Okinawa were reached.

A draft of the November 21st, 1969, Agreed Minute to Joint Communique of United States President Nixon and Japanese Prime Minister Sato was found in 1994. "The existence of this document has never been officially recognized by the Japanese or U.S. governments." The English text of the draft agreement reads:

United States President:
Japanese Prime Minister:

Alleged nuclear weapons incidents on Okinawa
Complete information surrounding U.S. nuclear accidents is not generally available via official channels. News of accidents on the island usually did not reach much farther than the islands local news, protest groups, eyewitnesses and rumor mills. However, the incidents that were publicized garnered international opposition to chemical and nuclear weapons and set the stage for the 1971 Okinawa Reversion Agreement to officially ending the U.S. military occupation on Okinawa.

32 Mace Missiles were kept on constant nuclear alert in hardened hangars at four of the island's launch sites. The 280mm M65 Atomic Cannon nicknamed "Atomic Annie" and the projectiles it fired were also based here. Okinawa at one point hosted as many as 1,200 nuclear warheads. At the time, nuclear storage locations existed at Kadena AFB in Chibana and the hardened MGM-13 MACE missile launch sites; Naha AFB, Henoko [Camp Henoko (Ordnance Ammunition Depot) at Camp Schwab], and the Nike Hercules units on Okinawa.

In June or July 1959, a MIM-14 Nike-Hercules anti-aircraft missile was accidentally fired from the Nike site 8 battery at Naha Air Base on Okinawa which according to some witnesses, was complete with a nuclear warhead. While the missile was undergoing continuity testing of the firing circuit, known as a squib test, stray voltage caused a short circuit in a faulty cable that was lying in a puddle and allowed the missile's rocket engines to ignite with the launcher still in a horizontal position. The Nike missile left the launcher and smashed through a fence and down into a beach area skipping the warhead out across the water "like a stone." The rocket's exhaust blast killed two Army technicians and injured one. A similar accidental launch of a Nike-H missile had occurred on April 14, 1955, at the W-25 site in Davidsonville, Maryland, which is near the National Security Agency headquarters at Fort George G. Meade.

On October 28, 1962, during the peak of Cuban Missile Crisis U.S. Strategic Forces were at Defense Condition Two or DEFCON 2. According to missile technicians who witnessed events, the four MACE B missile sites on Okinawa erroneously received coded launch orders to fire all of their 32 nuclear cruise missiles at the Soviets and their allies. Quick thinking by Capt. William Bassett who questioned whether the order was "the real thing, or the biggest screw up we will ever experience in our lifetime” delayed the orders to launch until the error was realized by the missile operations center. According to witness John Bordne, Capt. Bassett was the senior field officer commanding the missiles and was nearly forced to have a subordinate lieutenant who was intent on following the orders to launch his missiles shot by armed security guards. No U.S. Government record of this incident has ever been officially released. Former missileers have refuted Bordne's account.

Next, on December 5, 1965, off of the coast of Okinawa, an A-4 Skyhawk attack aircraft rolled off of an elevator of the aircraft carrier  USS Ticonderoga (CV-14) into 16,000 feet of water resulting in the loss of the pilot, the aircraft, and the B43 nuclear bomb it was carrying, all of which were too deep for recovery. Since the ship was traveling to Japan from duty in the Vietnam war zone, no public mention was made of the incident at the time and it would not come to light until 1981 when a Pentagon report revealed that a one-megaton bomb had been lost. Japan then formally asked for details of the incident.

Last, In September 1968, Japanese newspapers reported that radioactive Cobalt-60 had been detected contaminating portions of the Naha Port Facility, sickening three. The radioactive contamination was believed by scientists to have emanated from visiting U.S. nuclear submarines.

B-52 Crash at Kadena Air Base (1968)

Finally, on November 19, 1968, a U.S. Air Force Strategic Air Command (SAC) B-52 Stratofortress (registration number 55-01030) with a full bomb load, broke up and caught fire after the plane aborted takeoff at Kadena Air Base, Okinawa while it was conducting an Operation Arc Light bombing mission to the Socialist Republic of Vietnam during the Vietnam War. The plane's pilot was able to keep the plane on the ground and bring the aircraft to a stop while preventing a much larger catastrophe. The aircraft came to rest near the edge of the Kadena's perimeter, some 250 meters from the Chibana Ammunition Depot.

The fire resulting from the aborted takeoff ignited the plane's fuel and detonated the plane's 30,000-pound (13,600 kg) bomb load, causing a blast so powerful that it created a crater under the burning aircraft some thirty feet deep and sixty feet across. The plane was reduced "to a black spot on the runway". The blast was so large that Air Force spokesman had to announce that there had only been conventional bombs on board the plane. Nothing remained of the aircraft except the landing gear and engine assemblies, a few bombs, and some loose explosive that had not detonated. Very small fragments of aircraft metal from the enormous blast were "spread like confetti," leaving the crew to use a double entendre to refer to the cleanup work, calling it, "'52 Pickup." The planes Electronic Warfare Officer and the Crew Chief later died from burn injuries after being evacuated from Okinawa. Two Okinawan workers were also injured in the blasts.

Had the plane become airborne, only seconds later it would have crashed farther north of the runway and directly into the Chibana Ammunition Depot, which stored ammunition, bombs, high explosives, tens of thousands of artillery shells, and warheads for 19 different atomic and thermonuclear weapons systems in the hardened weapon storage areas. The depot held the Mark 28 nuclear bomb warheads used in the MGM-13 Mace cruise missile as well as warheads for nuclear tipped MGR-1 Honest John and MIM-14 Nike-Hercules (Nike-H) missiles. The depot also included 52 igloos in the Red Hat Storage Area containing Project Red Hat's chemical weapons and presumably Project 112's biological agents.

The crash led to demands to remove the B-52s from Okinawa and strengthened a push for the reversion from U.S. rule in Okinawa. The crash sparked fears that another potential disaster on the island could put the chemical and nuclear stockpile and the surrounding population in jeopardy and increased the urgency of moving them to a less populated and less active storage location.

Nuclear debate
Former Mayor and Governor of Osaka Tōru Hashimoto in 2008 argued on several television programs that Japan should possess nuclear weapons, but has since said that this was his private opinion.

Former Governor of Tokyo 1999-2012, Shintaro Ishihara was a advocate of Japan having nuclear weapons.

On 29 March 2016, then-U.S. President candidate Donald Trump suggested that Japan should develop its own nuclear weapons, claiming that it was becoming too expensive for the US to continue to protect Japan from countries such as China, North Korea, and Russia that already have their own nuclear weapons.

On 27 February 2022, former prime minister Shinzo Abe proposed that Japan should consider a nuclear sharing arrangement with the US similar to NATO. This includes housing American nuclear weapons on Japanese soil for deterrence. This plan comes in the wake of the 2022 Russian invasion of Ukraine. Many Japanese politicians consider Vladimir Putin's threat to use nuclear weapons against a non-nuclear state to be a game changer. Abe wants to stimulate necessary debate:

See also

 Japanese nuclear weapon program
 Japan's non-nuclear weapons policy
 Nuclear latency
 Secret and special weapons in Shōwa Japan

References

Weapons of mass destruction by country
Military of Japan